Colonel William Munroe (October 28, 1742 – October 30, 1827)  was a soldier in the American Revolutionary War. He was the orderly sergeant of the Lexington militia at the Battle of Lexington and Concord and as a lieutenant at the Battle of Saratoga. He was also a militia colonel and a prominent man politically in the town of Lexington.

Ancestry
William Munroe was the great grandson of William Munroe, who was captured at the Battle of Worcester by Oliver Cromwell's troops, and taken to Boston as an indentured servant.  He worked hard and quickly bought his freedom.  He settled in the settlement of Cambridge Farms Parish, (later Lexington, Massachusetts), Massachusetts, in a part of the town called Scotland.

Family
William Munroe was married to Anna Smith and they had six children.  After her death in 1781 he later married Polly Rodgers.

His obituary from the American Mercury (CT), Nov. 20, 1820, p. 1 reports: Death of another Revolutionary Hero.--

Businesses and occupations
Munroe owned two businesses in April 1775.  One was his tavern, known as Munroe Tavern, and the other was a retail shop.  Several pages of his ledger survive.  He was also the orderly sergeant of the Lexington militia.

Roles in the Battles of Lexington and Concord
William Munroe fought in the Battle of Lexington acting as orderly sergeant in the company commanded by Captain John Parker.

Later in the day, his home, Munroe Tavern, was occupied by Colonel Percy.  Percy placed a cannon on the tavern's land, and used it as a field hospital and refuge for retreating troops.

In March 1825, fifty years after the battle, Munroe gave a sworn testimony about his activities on April 19, 1775.

Roles in the Battle of Saratoga
William Munroe served at the Battle of Saratoga under the rank of lieutenant.

Later life
William Munroe was a Captain in militia when he marched with a body of men towards Springfield during the Shays Rebellion in 1786. The Munroe family was visited by the first President of the United States, George Washington, in November 1789. He was a selectman for nine years and represented his town for two years.

References

1742 births
1827 deaths
William
Massachusetts militiamen in the American Revolution
People of colonial Massachusetts
Colonial American merchants